Muhtasham Kashani (1500–1588) was an Iranian poet of the Safavid era. He was influential in Shi'ite religious poetry, especially marsiyah poetry mourning the tragedy of Ashura. He was born in Kashan, where he spent all of his life. He is well-known for his poetry about Imam al-Husayn's martyrdom in the form of tarkib band.

His main occupation, like that of his father, was in the cloth industry (in Kashan) before he took up poetry.

References

1500 births
1588 deaths
16th-century Iranian poets
People from Kashan
16th-century writers of Safavid Iran